The Railway Procurement Agency was a state agency of the  Department of Transport, Tourism and Sport in the Republic of Ireland, charged with the development of light railway and the future metro infrastructure. It was established on 28 December 2001 under the Transport (Railway Infrastructure) Act 2001 and dissolved on 1 August 2015 under the terms of the Roads Act 2015, when all of its functions were transferred to the National Roads Authority (NRA). In order to better reflect its expanded remit, the NRA has since 1 August 2015 described itself for operational purposes as Transport Infrastructure Ireland.

Many of the staff of the agency came from the Light Rail Project Office of Córas Iompair Éireann (CIÉ), which was dissolved upon the RPA's inception.  The agency operated completely independently of CIÉ. This was due to a fear by the government that CIÉ's implementation of new rail projects would be slow and inefficient, as the company is not well regarded by the country's political leadership.
The RPA's main role was overseeing the operation of the Luas system, along with the planning of new Luas and Metro lines for Dublin as laid out under the Irish Government's Capital Investment Plan. The operation of the Luas is contracted out to Transdev, and the RPA were responsible for monitoring their performance.
 
The agency had no role in the mainline railway system, which is operated by Iarnród Éireann, itself a subsidiary of CIÉ.

The RPA was also charged with developing an integrated ticketing system for all public transport modes in Dublin. This resulted in the introduction of the Leap card on 12 December 2011.

National Transport Authority initiatives
The RPA had a crucial role in implementing key rail elements of the Irish Government's initiatives, administered by the National Transport Authority. It was responsible for the planning, coordination and procurement through conventional means, and through Public Private Partnership, where necessary, of the following projects:

Dublin Metro, consisting of Metro North and Metro West- Deferred indefinitely in 2011.
The RPA was also responsible for planning new Luas lines to Lucan, along with a second Green line extension to Bray.

The RPA was also responsible for the following projects, all now complete:
Connolly Station to Point Depot extension  - Red Line (Completed in 2009).
Sandyford to Cherrywood/Brides Glen extension - Green Line (Completed in 2010).
Belgard to Citywest extension - Red Line (Completed in 2011).
St Stephen's Green to Broombridge (Luas Cross City) extension - Green Line (Completed in 2017).

Controversies

Luas Red Line engineering 
In 2006, the RPA were criticised for allowing the Red Line to be opened, in the knowledge that parts of the track support of line were faulty in regards to track support. This became public through an independent report by Austrian consultants.

Chief Executive dispute
Early on the CIÉ project director of Luas, Donal Mangan, took legal action as he felt that he had the right to be its chief executive. For two years the agency paid his salary and gave him an office, even though the chief executive's position had been filled by Frank Allen.

References

External links 
 Railway Procurement Agency (archived 2004)
 Rail Users Ireland - Ireland's National Rail User organisation

Transport companies of the Republic of Ireland
Rail transport in the Republic of Ireland
Tram transport in the Republic of Ireland